The Belize Premier Football League (BPFL) (Caribbean Motors Cup) was the premier division of association football in Belize sanctioned by the Football Federation of Belize. The league disbanded in 2011 after the merger with the Super League of Belize to create a new top league in Belize, the Premier League of Belize.

Belize Premier Football League - 2010-11 Opening Season

Belize Defence Force (Belize City)
Belmopan Blaze (Belmopan)
FC Belize (Belize City)
Griga United (Dangriga)
Hankook Verdes United (Benque Viejo)
San Felipe Barcelona (Orange Walk Town)
San Pedro Sea Dogs (San Pedro Town)
Toledo Ambassadors (Toledo District)

Previous winners
Previous winners were:

Interdistrict Championship

1969/70 : FC San Joaquín
1976/77 : Queens Park Rangers (Stann Creek United)
1978/79 : Queens Park Rangers (Stann Creek United)

BPFL Champions (1991-97 BSFL, 1997-2003 BFL)

1991/92 : La Victoria (Corozal)
1992/93 : Acros Caribe (Belize City)
1993/94 : La Victoria (Corozal)
1994/95 : Acros Crystal (Belize City)
1995/96 : Suga Boys Juventus (Orange Walk)
1996/97 : Suga Boys Juventus (Orange Walk)
1997/98 : Suga Boys Juventus (Orange Walk)
1998/99 : Suga Boys Juventus (Orange Walk)
1999/00 : Sagitún (Independence)
2000/01 : Kulture Yabra FC (Belize City)
2001/02 : Kulture Yabra FC (Belize City)

FFB "A" Tournament

2002/03 : New Site Erei (Dangriga)
2003/04 : Boca Juniors

BPFL Regent Challenge Champions Cup (Dissident League)

2002/03 : Sagitún (Independence)
2003 : Kulture Yabra FC (Belize City)
2004 : Sagitún (Independence)

BPFL Reunited

2005 : Suga Boys Juventus (Orange Walk)
2005/06 : New Site Erei (Dangriga)
2006 : New Site Erei (Dangriga)

RFG Insurance League

2006-07: FC Belize (Belize City)
2007: FC Belize (Belize City)
2007-08: Hankook Verdes (San Ignacio)
 2008-09: Ilagulei FC (Dangriga)
 2009: Nizhee Corozal (Corozal)
 2009-10: Belize Defence Force (Opening season)

Caribbean Motors Cup
 2009-10: Belize Defence Force (Closing season)
2010-11: Belize Defence Force (Opening season)

Top scorers
Top scorers 

O = Opening, C = Closing

References

External links
Belize - List of Champions, RSSSF.com

 
1991 establishments in Belize
Defunct top level association football leagues
Football leagues in Belize
Defunct sports leagues in Belize
2011 disestablishments in Belize
Sports leagues established in 1991
Sports leagues disestablished in 2011